The Kola class was the NATO reporting name for a group of frigates built for the Soviet Navy in the 1950s. The Soviet designation was Storozhevoi Korabl (escort ship) Project 42. These ships were analogous to World War II era destroyer escorts or German s. The programme consisted of only 8 ships as these vessels were considered to be too expensive for series production and the smaller and cheaper  was built instead. Radars and sonars were fitted.

Design

The ships were designed for patrolling Soviet waters and escorting convoys. The design process involved a specification issued in 1946 and two design bureau submitted competing designs with both diesel and steam turbine machinery. The hull was welded and longitudinally framed. The machinery suite consisted of alternating boiler rooms and turbine rooms in a unit machinery arrangement. Armament consisted of four single  dual purpose guns and torpedo tubes.

Ships

All ships were built by Yantar Yard, Kaliningrad. They were the first major ships built there after the transfer of the area to Soviet rule following World War II.

See also
List of ships of the Soviet Navy
List of ships of Russia by project number

References
 Gardiner, Robert; Chumbley, Stephen & Budzbon, Przemysław (1995). Conway's All the World's Fighting Ships 1947-1995. Annapolis, Maryland: Naval Institute Press. 
 Site in Russian Language
 Site in Russian Language
 Russian Kola Class Frigates - Complete Ship List

 
Frigate classes
Frigates of the Soviet Navy